The 2014 Baltic Futsal Cup was held from December 5 to 7, 2014 in Lithuania. Latvia won the tournament.

Standings

Matches

Goalscorers 
3 goals
  Germans Matjušenko

2 goals

  Marius Bezykornovas
  Lukas Sendžikas
  Maksim Aleksejev
  Maksim Sens

1 goal

  Igors Avanesovs
  Jurijs Arhipovs-Prokofjevs
  Sergejs Nagibins
  Arsenij Buinickij
  Arūnas Šteinas
  Stanislav Bõstrov
  Vladislav Tšurilkin

Own goals
  Andrei Gornev (vs. Lithuania)

Awards 

 Most Valuable Player

 Top Scorer
  Germans Matjušenko (3 goals)
 Fair-Play Award

References

External links 
Futsal Planet

2014
2014 in Lithuanian football
2014 in Latvian football
2014 in Estonian football
International futsal competitions hosted by Lithuania
2014–15 in European futsal